Pavlov is a municipality and village in Jihlava District in the Vysočina Region of the Czech Republic. It has about 400 inhabitants.

Administrative parts
Villages of Bezděkov and Stajiště administrative parts of Pavlov.

References

Villages in Jihlava District